Ahmad Aqa (also Romanized as Aḩmad Āqā) is a village in Howmeh-ye Sharqi Rural District, in the Central District of Izeh County, Khuzestan Province, Iran. At the 2006 census, its population was 50, in 8 families.

References 

Populated places in Izeh County